"Breathe You in" is a song by German girl group Monrose. It was written by Thanh Bui, Rodney Mark Davies, and Gary Pinto and recorded by Monrose for their fourth studio album Ladylike (2010), while production was helmed by frequent collaborators Pete Kirtley as well as Andrew Murray and Christian Ballard from production duo Snowflakers. An uplifting piano-led ballad with minor contemporary R&B elements, "Breathe You In" is built upon a harp motif. Lyically, it chronicles a woman's love for a man.

Released as the album's third single on 3 December 2010, "Breathe You In" also served as the group's farewell single following the announcement of their disbandment on 25 November 2010. Commercially, it peaked at number 60 on the German Singles Chart, becoming their least successful single. Monrose performed "Breathe You In" at The Dome 56 on 26 November 2010 in front of an audience of 10.000 people. They also performed the song at the Popstars: Girls forever final on 9 December 2010.

Composition
"Breathe You In" is a pop ballad. Vocally, the song follows the typical ballad style of Monrose. The song contains acoustic guitar, strings and piano. About the song, Monrose stated "We knew from the beginning that "Breathe You In" has to be on our album! The text affects! The song makes your skin crawl – and our fans love it!"

Critical reception
LetMeEntertainYou.de gave the song a positive review, stating that "In the ballad, the girls show what they have vocal within." Laut.de stated that the song is too similar to their past ballads. Albert Ranner from CDSTARTS.de wrote that ""Breathe You In" starts like a trashy Whitney Houston clipping, but raises, despite  randomness, in the song structure.

Music video
The music video for "Breathe You In" premiered on 25 November 2010 on the group's official YouTube channel, and on 26 November 2010 on VIVA Germany. The video shows a footage of the group and contains pictures of their casting, pictures from their childhood, concert cuttings and home videos.

B-side
The b-side of the single will be the song "Endlich Seh' Ich Das Licht". The song is the German version of "I See The Light" and is featured on the German edition of the film "Tangled", where it will be played during the end credits. The song also appears on the German soundtrack release of "Tangled".

Track listings

Credits and personnel
Credits adapted from the liner notes of Ladylike.

Christian Ballard – drums, production
Thanh Bui – writing
Mandy Capristo – vocals
Rodney Mark Davies – writing
Senna Gammour – vocals
Jonas Jeberg – writing
Neil Jones – guitar

Pete Kirtley – bass, production
Bahar Kızıl – vocals
Andrew Murray – keyboards, production
Gary Pinto – writing
Jackie Rawe – backing vocalist
Ren Swan – mixing
Jonas Zadow – recording

Charts

Release history

References

External links
 Official website

2010 singles
Monrose songs
2010 songs
Songs written by Gary Pinto
EMI Records singles